Louise Emma Joseph (born 1965), known professionally as Dreda Say Mitchell MBE, is a British novelist, broadcaster, journalist and campaigner. She was appointed a Member of the Order of the British Empire (MBE) in 2020 for her services to literature and educational work in prison.

Background
Mitchell is a best-selling and award-winning crime author, broadcaster, journalist and campaigner who grew up on a housing estate in the East End of London. Her parents are from the Caribbean island of Grenada. She attended Bishop Challoner Girls’ School and went on to receive a BA (Hons) in African history from SOAS, the School of Oriental and African Studies, University of London She also has a MA in education studies from the University of North London. For twenty-five years she worked as a teacher and education consultant in London with a special focus on raising the educational achievement of children from minority ethnic and working-class backgrounds. The Times Education Supplement: "Mitchell gives a voice to the working class communities she grew up in."

Career

Mitchell's writing career started on a creative writing course at Soho's Groucho Club where she began writing her debut novel Running Hot. Her debut was awarded the Memorial John Creasey Dagger, CWA, in 2005, the first time a Black British author has scooped this award. She has since written seventeen crime books, many with her writing partner Tony Mason, including their international best-selling psychological thriller, Spare Room. Lee Child describes her work, "As good as it gets. Mitchell is English fiction’s brightest new voice." Her Gangland Girls Crime series has been a No.1 crime series on Amazon. She has also written a Quick Read for The Reading Agency as part of their drive to enhance reading skills among hard to reach communities. She has been a judge on the National Book Awards, Index on Censorship Awards and The John Creasey Dagger. She was the 2011 chair of the Harrogate Theakston Crime Fiction Festival, Europe’s largest crime festival. Mitchell and Mason were part of Sky Arts ground-breaking Arts50 in 2019.

Agatha Christie
Mitchell is one of 12 contemporary female writers – also including Val McDermid, Naomi Alderman, Kate Mosse, Elly Griffiths and Ruth Ware – chosen as contributors to a new anthology featuring Agatha Christie's fictional character Miss Marple.

Journalism

Mitchell is also a social and cultural commentator who has presented BBC Radio 4’s, Open Book and BBC Radio 3’s The Sunday Feature exploring life on housing estates. Her television appearances include Question Time, Newsnight, The Review Show, Front Row Late, BBC Breakfast, The Victoria Derbyshire Show and Canada's Sun News Live. Her radio credits include BBC Radio 4's Front Row, Saturday Review, Vanessa, The Simon Mayo Show, Four Thought and Nightwaves. For many years she reviewed the newspapers on the Stephen Nolan Show, BBC 5 Live.

Mitchell has written for The Guardian, The Independent and The Observer, on issues including "race", culture and class.

Educational work

Mitchell was commissioned by the Youth Justice Board to facilitate Write-on, a pilot creative writing and mentoring project in Feltham and Cookham Wood YOIs focusing on children of African-Caribbean, mixed heritage and white working-class backgrounds. One of the students was awarded three Koestler awards, including the inaugural Peter Selby Award for Under-18 Creative Writing. Mitchell continues to work in prisons as a guest speaker and delivering creative writing workshops.

Awards and honours

 MBE in Her Majesty The Queen's 2020 New Year Honours, for services to literature and education work in prisons.
 The Memorial John Creasey Dagger, Crime Writers' Association, 2005, the first time a Black British writer has scooped this honour.
 World Book Night Selection, Geezer Girls, 2014.
 Contributor in the multi-award winning Books To Die For anthology, 2014
 50 Remarkable Women in Britain, Lady Geek in association with Nokia, 2012
 Silver Contribution Award, Calabash, 2011

Charities 

 Trustee, The Royal Literary Fund.
 Ambassador, The Reading Agency.
 Patron, SI Leeds Literary Prize for unpublished fiction by Black and Asian women.

Bibliography 
 Running Hot, MAIA Press, 2004
 Killer Tune, Hodder, 2007

Gangland Girl Series
       Geezer Girls, Hodder, 2009
       Gangster Girl, Hodder, 2010
       Hit Girls, Hodder, 2011

DI Rio Wray Thriller Series
       Vendetta, Hodder, 2014
       Death Trap, Hodder, 2015
       Snatched (e-novella), Hodder, 2015

Flesh and Blood Series
       Blood Sister, Hodder, 2016
       Blood Mother, Hodder, 2017
       Blood Daughter, Hodder, 2017
       Blood Secrets, Mitchell and Joseph, 2018
       One False Move (novella), Quick Read, 2017

Psychological Standalones
      Spare Room, Bloodhound Books, 2019
      Trap Door, Bloodhound Books, 2020
      Say Her Name, Amazon Publishing, 2022

Big Mo Crime Series
      Dirty Tricks, Mitchell and Joseph, 2020
      Fight Dirty, Mitchell and Joseph, 2020
      Wicked Women, Mitchell and Joseph, 2021

References

External links
 
 Dreda Say Mitchell at Amazon
 Dreda Say Mitchell at The Guardian

1965 births
Black British women writers
British crime writers
Living people
British women novelists
21st-century British women writers
21st-century British novelists
Women mystery writers